The 2018 Asian Women's U19 Volleyball Championship, referred to as the 2018 SMM Asian Women's U19 Volleyball Championship for sponsorship reasons, was the nineteenth edition of the Asian Women's U19 Volleyball Championship, a biennial international volleyball tournament organised by the Asian Volleyball Confederation (AVC) with Volleyball Federation of Vietnam (VFV) for the women's under-19 national teams of Asia. The tournament was held in Bắc Ninh Province, Vietnam, from 10 to 17 June 2018.

A total of fifteen teams played in the tournament, with players born on or after 1 January 2000 eligible to participate.

Same as previous editions, the tournament acted as the AVC qualifiers for the FIVB Volleyball Women's U20 World Championship. The top two teams qualified for the 2019 FIVB Volleyball Women's U20 World Championship, as the AVC representatives.

Qualification
The fifteen AVC member associations will participate in the tournament (included the India, who was suspended by the FIVB and was lifted the suspension in May 2018), Vietnam qualified as host country. There are thirteen teams participated in the 2016 Asian Women's U19 Volleyball Championship, and the one remaining teams did not participate in the previous edition. The fifteen AVC member associations were from four zonal associations, including, Central Asia (4 teams), East Asia (6 teams), Oceania (2 team) and Southeast Asia (3 teams). While any West Asian teams did not participate this edition and Uzbekistan withdrew from the tournament.

Qualified teams
The following teams qualified for the tournament.

Pools composition
This is the first Asian Women's U19 Volleyball Championship which will use the new competition format. Following the 2017 AVC Board of Administration’s unanimous decision, the new format will see teams being drawn into four pools up to the total amount of the participating teams. Each team as well as the host side will be assigned into a pool according to their 2016 ranking. The four best-ranked teams will be drawn in the same Pool A, the next best four will contest Pool B, the next best four will contest Pool C. Pool D will comprise teams finishing next best three teams.

Venues

Preliminary round
All times are Indochina Time (UTC+07:00)

Pool standing procedure
 Number of matches won
 Match points
 Sets ratio
 Points ratio
 Result of the last match between the tied teams

Match won 3–0 or 3–1: 3 match points for the winner, 0 match points for the loser
Match won 3–2: 2 match points for the winner, 1 match point for the loser
Match forfeited: 0 match points for each.

Pool A

|}

Pool B

|}

Pool C

|}

Pool D

|}

Bracket composition

Final round

Classification round (R9–15)

Classification round (R13–15)

Thirteenth to Fifteenth places
Winners will advance to Thirteenth places play-off.
Loser will finish at Fifteenth place.

|}

Thirteenth place

|}

Classification round (R9–15)

Ninth to Fifteenth places
Winners will advance to Ninth to Twelfth place
Losers will transfer to Classification round (R13–15).

|}

Ninth to Twelfth places
Winners will advance to Ninth places play-off.
Losers will be given a chance to Eleventh places play-off.

|}

Eleventh place

|}

Ninth place

|}

Classification round (R5–8)

Fifth to Eight places
Winners will advance to Fifth places play-off.
Losers will be given a chance to Seventh places play-off.

|}

Seventh place

|}

Fifth place

|}

Championship round (R1–15)

Round of 15
Winners will advance to Quarter-finals.
Losers will transfer to Classification round (R9–15).

|}

Quarter-finals
Winners will advance to Semi-finals.
Losers will transfer to Classification round (R5–8).

|}

Semi-finals
Winners will advance to Finals and World Championship.
Losers will be given a chance to Third place play-off.

|}

Third place

|}

Final

|}

Final standing

Awards
Most Valuable Player
 Kanon Sonoda
Best Outside Spikers
 Thanacha Sooksod
 Ayumi Yoshida
Best Setter
  Kanon Sonoda
Best Opposite Spiker
 Xu Luyao
Best Middle Blockers
 Wen Yi-chin
 Jiao Dian
Best Libero
 Sayaka Daikuzono

Broadcasting rights

See also
 2018 Asian Men's U20 Volleyball Championship

References

External links
 Asian Volleyball Confederation
 Bulletin 1
 Bulletin 2
 Bulletin 3
 Bulletin 4
 Bulletin 5

2018
Asian U19 Championship
International volleyball competitions hosted by Vietnam
2018 in Vietnamese women's sport
June 2018 sports events in Asia